is a  retired Japanese swimmer who competed in the 1992 Summer Olympics.

References

1973 births
Living people
Japanese female medley swimmers
Olympic swimmers of Japan
Swimmers at the 1992 Summer Olympics
Swimmers at the 1990 Asian Games
Asian Games competitors for Japan
20th-century Japanese women